AltspaceVR was a social VR platform that was founded in 2013 by Eric Romo and launched its initial product in May 2015. In 2017 it was acquired by Microsoft and became part of the Mixed Reality division (alongside notable products like HoloLens and HoloLens 2) within the Cloud and AI group. Some elements of the platform appear in Microsoft Mesh.

The platform largely consisted of user-generated spaces called "worlds", which could be visited by other users.  Individuals could gather, talk, collaborate, and be co-present in small to large groups.

The platform was regularly home to a wide variety of live virtual events from VR church and LGBTQI+ meetups to large business conferences and magic shows.

In January 2023 it was announced on the AltspaceVR Homepage that the service would be shutting down on March 10, 2023.

Worlds 
AltspaceVR was organised in spaces called "worlds", which could be found and accessed via a floating menu or via in-world "teleporters".  Some large worlds, such as the "Campfire", were built and maintained by official developers as places for users to meet and interact. As of May 2022, AltVR removed all developer-maintained worlds.

Altspace's internal menus included a list of "featured" user-defined worlds and a real-time list of the most "popular" worlds, arranged by the number of users currently visiting each world.  Other menus listed current and planned "events", which took place inside official or user-generated worlds.

Events 
Notable events taking place within AltspaceVR included:

 a virtual fashion show for 2020 Paris Fashion week
 a red carpet premiere of Baba Yaga with celebrities Jennifer Hudson and Daisy Ridley was held in a VR world produced by Big Rock Creative.
 In 2020 AltspaceVR was home to BRCvr, a recognized universe of the Burning Man multiverse.
 In 2021 AltspaceVR was home to Thursday Night Club Premier and Cute Tech's Mood Mondays a nightclub with a live DJ Blade Relic.
 In 2022 AltspaceVR hosted the book launch of new sci-fi short stories book with introduction by Douglas Rushkoff and "The Summoned" story by Eva Pascoe with live feed from authors by Zoom into Altspace event venue

Supported hardware 
AltspaceVR was supported on several VR headsets including:

 HTC Vive 
 Oculus Rift/Rift-S
 Oculus Quest/Quest 2
 Windows Mixed Reality devices
 Samsung Gear VR (discontinued mid-2020)
 Oculus Go (discontinued 2020)
 Google Daydream (discontinued 2019

The platform was also available as a 2D application for Apple and Windows PCs and, until 2019, for Android devices.

See also 
 Horizon Worlds

References

External links
 

Software companies based in the San Francisco Bay Area
Microsoft acquisitions
Microsoft subsidiaries
Software companies of the United States
Companies established in 2013
Virtual reality communities